The 2017 FIFA U-20 World Cup was the 21st edition of the FIFA U-20 World Cup, the biennial international men's youth football championship contested by the under-20 national teams of the member associations of FIFA, since its inception in 1977 as the FIFA World Youth Championship. The tournament was hosted by South Korea from 20 May to 11 June 2017.

Along with Canada, Chile, Japan, and Mexico, South Korea became the fifth nation to have hosted all of FIFA men's international competitions, namely the 2002 FIFA World Cup, the 2001 FIFA Confederations Cup, and the 2007 FIFA U-17 World Cup.

The South Korean FA originally made a request to host the tournament outside the traditional June/July period, as it would clash with South Korea's rainy season, as well as any possible national team selection should they have qualified for the Confederations Cup.

Serbia, the 2015 champions, were not able to defend their title as they failed to reach the final round of the UEFA qualifying tournament. In doing so, they became the fifth consecutive incumbent title holder to fail to qualify for the subsequent tournament. The official match ball used in the tournament was Adidas Krasava.

England won their first FIFA U-20 World Cup title after beating Venezuela 1–0 in the final via a goal from Dominic Calvert-Lewin.

Host selection
Along with asking member associations whether it wished to host the Under 20, Under 17 or the Beach Soccer World Cup in 2017 (along with Women's Tournaments a year previous), a declaration of interest would need to have been sent by 15 May 2013. A total of 12 countries submitted a bid to host the tournament by the May 2013 deadline:

 (later withdrew)

 (later withdrew)
 

The final decision on who would be hosts were made as part of FIFA's Executive Committee meetings in Brazil on 5 December 2013 with Korea Republic being awarded the hosting rights.

Qualified teams
A total of 24 teams qualified for the final tournament. In addition to South Korea who qualified automatically as hosts, the other 23 teams qualified from six separate continental competitions. Starting from 2017, the Oceania Football Confederation received an additional slot (in total two), while UEFA will have five instead of six slots.

 1.  Teams that made their debut.

Venues
Cheonan, Daejeon, Incheon, Seogwipo, Jeonju and Suwon were the six cities chosen to host the competition from a shortlist of nine, with Seoul, Pohang, and Ulsan not chosen.

Preparation
As part of preparations for the U-20 World Cup, the 2016 Suwon JS Cup, an international football friendly tournament, was held to prepare the host organisers.

Organization
The following were key milestones in the organization of the tournament:
The match schedule was announced by FIFA on 23 November 2015.
Former South Korean internationals Ahn Jung-hwan and Park Ji-sung were appointed as the ambassadors of the tournament.
The official emblem, slogan ("Trigger the Fever") and look of the tournament were unveiled on 16 June 2016.
The official mascot, Chaormi, a young tiger, was unveiled on 25 August 2016.
Details of the volunteer programme, which was launched on 1 November 2016, was released on 18 October 2016.
The official posters were released on 27 October 2016.
Venue package tickets went on sale on 1 November 2016, while general ticket sales began on 2 January 2017. All-out ticket sales kicked off on 16 March 2017.
NCT Dream were appointed as Local Organising Committee ambassadors, and were also chosen to sing the official song of the tournament: "Trigger the Fever".

Draw
The draw was held on 15 March 2017, 15:00 KST (UTC+9), at the Suwon Atrium in Suwon, South Korea. Two Argentine players who have won the FIFA U-20 World Cup, Diego Maradona and Pablo Aimar, participated in the draw. Minho Choi from the South Korean idol group SHINee also participated in the draw.

The 24 teams were drawn into six groups of four teams, with hosts South Korea being allocated to position A1. The teams were seeded into their respective pots based on their results in the last five FIFA U-20 World Cups (more recent tournaments weighted more heavily), with bonus points awarded to confederation champions. Teams from the same confederation could not be drawn against each other for the group stage.

Match officials
A total of 22 refereeing trios (a referee and two assistant referees), 5 support referees and 21 video assistant referees were appointed for the tournament. This was the first FIFA underage tournament which uses the video assistant referee.

Squads

Each team had to name a preliminary squad of 35 players. From the preliminary squad, the team had to name a final squad of 21 players (three of whom must be goalkeepers) by the FIFA deadline. Players in the final squad could be replaced due to serious injury up to 24 hours prior to kickoff of the team's first match. The squads were announced by FIFA on 11 May 2017.

Group stage
The top two teams of each group and the four best third-placed teams advanced to the round of 16.

All times are local, KST (UTC+9).

Tiebreakers
The rankings of teams in each group were determined as follows (regulations Article 17.7):

If two or more teams were equal on the basis of the above three criteria, their rankings were determined by:

Group A

Group B

Group C

Group D

Group E

Group F

Ranking of third-placed teams
The four best teams among those ranked third are determined as follows (regulations Article 17.8):

Knockout stage
In the knockout stage, if a match was level at the end of normal playing time, extra time was played (two periods of 15 minutes each) and followed, if necessary, by a penalty shoot-out to determine the winner. However, for the third place match, no extra time was played and the winner was determined by kicks from the penalty mark.

In the round of 16, the four third-placed teams were matched with the winners of groups A, B, C, and D. The specific match-ups involving the third-placed teams depend on which four third-placed teams qualified for the round of 16:

Bracket

Round of 16

Quarter-finals

Semi-finals

Third place play-off

Final

This was the first ever final for both England and Venezuela in the history of the tournament, in their 11th and 2nd appearances respectively. England's previous best result was in 1993 when they finished third, while Venezuela were eliminated in the round of 16 in 2009. This was England's first appearance and victory in the final of a global football tournament since their senior side's 1966 FIFA World Cup victory, ending 51 years of waiting for a global tournament trophy.

Awards
The following awards were given at the conclusion of the tournament. They were all sponsored by Adidas, except for the FIFA Fair Play Award and Goal of the Tournament.

Goalscorers
With five goals, Riccardo Orsolini is the top scorers in the tournament. In total, 140 goals were scored by 90 different players, with three of them credited as own goals.

5 goals

  Riccardo Orsolini 

4 goals

  Dominic Solanke
  Jean-Kévin Augustin
  Josh Sargent
  Sergio Córdova
  Fashion Sakala

3 goals

  Ademola Lookman
  Reza Shekari
  Ritsu Dōan
  Diogo Gonçalves
  Bong Kalo

2 goals

  Lautaro Martínez
  Marcelo Torres
  Bryan Cabezas
  Dominic Calvert-Lewin
  Allan Saint-Maximin
  Jorge Álvarez
  Giuseppe Panico
  Lee Seung-woo
  Paik Seung-ho
  Ronaldo Cisneros
  Myer Bevan
  Xadas
  Abdulrahman Al-Yami
  Jeremy Ebobisse
  Brooks Lennon
  Nicolás De La Cruz
  Adalberto Peñaranda
  Samuel Sosa
  Emmanuel Banda
  Patson Daka
  Enock Mwepu

1 goal

  Marcos Senesi
  Matías Zaracho
  Jostin Daly
  Randall Leal
  Jimmy Marin
  Jordy Caicedo
  Hernan Lino
  Adam Armstrong
  Lewis Cook
  Kieran Dowell
  Amine Harit
  Denis-Will Poha
  Martin Terrier
  Marcus Thuram
  Jonas Arweiler
  Kentu Malcolm Badu
  Emmanuel Iyoha
  Philipp Ochs
  Fabian Reese
  Suat Serdar
  Sendel Cruz
  Mehdi Mehdikhani
  Federico Dimarco
  Andrea Favilli
  Luca Vido
  Koki Ogawa
  Lim Min-hyeok
  Lee Sang-heon
  Edson Álvarez
  Kevin Magaña
  Hunter Ashworth
  Bruno Costa
  Hélder Ferreira
  Xande Silva
  Abdulelah Al-Amri
  Ousseynou Diagne
  Ibrahima Niane
  Luca de la Torre
  Justen Glad
  Lagos Kunga
  Auston Trusty
  Rodrigo Amaral
  Santiago Bueno
  Mathías Olivera
  Nicolás Schiappacasse
  Federico Valverde
  Ronaldo Wilkins
  Nahuel Ferraresi
  Yangel Herrera
  Wuilker Faríñez
  Jan Carlos Hurtado
  Ronaldo Peña
  Williams Velásquez
  Edward Chilufya
  Shemmy Mayembe

1 own goal

  Fikayo Tomori (playing against Guinea)
  Nima Taheri (playing against Portugal) 
  Takehiro Tomiyasu (playing against South Africa)

Source: FIFA

Final ranking
As per statistical convention in football, matches decided in extra time are counted as wins and losses, while matches decided by penalty shoot-outs are counted as draws.

Broadcasters rights
The following companies held the broadcasters rights:
 : KBS, MBC, SBS
 : TyC Sports, Cable Sport, Luján Cable Visión, La Matanza TV Cable, Santiago del Estero TV Cable
 : SporTV, Manchete Sports, Rede Bandeirantes
 : TSN, RDS
 : Sony Six (Only match between South Korea and Guinea)
 : RTV (4 matches in semifinals, third place match, and final)
 : RAI
 : BS Fuji, Fuji TV One Two Next
 : Astro
 : Televisa / TDN, TV Azteca
 : Sky Sport
 : Tigo Sports, Movistar Sports, Caacupé Cable Visión, Itauguá TV Cable, Paraguari TV Cable
 : Latina Televisión
 : ABS-CBN
 : Eurosport
 South America: DirecTV 
 : ELTA TV (4 matches in semifinals, third place match, and final) 
 : Eurosport, BBC (final only) 
 : Fox Sports, Telemundo
 : Tigo Sports, Movistar Sports, Canelones Cable Visión, Melo TV Cable, Paysandú TV Cable 
 : DirecTV, Meridiano Televisión, Venevisión
 : VTV, FPT Group

References

External links

FIFA U-20 World Cup Korea Republic 2017, FIFA.com
FIFA Technical Report 

 
2017
2017 in youth association football
2017 in South Korean football
International association football competitions hosted by South Korea
May 2017 sports events in South Korea
June 2017 sports events in South Korea